Bjørn Rongen (24 July 1906 – 26 August 1983) was a Norwegian novelist and children's writer. 

He was born   at Evanger in the Voss district of Hordaland, Norway. He lived in Drøbak most of his adult life.
He made his literary debut in 1934 with the story To semester. Among his most important works was the trilogy: Toget over vidda, I jøkulens skygge and Klart for tog,   from the period of the construction of the Bergen Line.
Rongen contributed a large number of short stories and was also a children's book author. He was awarded the Gyldendal's Endowment in 1955.

References

1906 births
1983 deaths
People from Voss
People from Frogn
Norwegian children's writers
20th-century Norwegian novelists